Thomas Joseph "Puddin" Colton (c. 1874 – c. 1958) was a rugby union player who represented Australia.

Colton, a flanker, was born in Brisbane, Queensland and claimed a total of 2 international rugby caps for Australia. His debut game was against Great Britain, at Sydney, on 2 July 1904. He was the younger brother of inaugural Australian representative player Alfred Colton.

References

Australian rugby union players
Australia international rugby union players
Year of birth uncertain
Rugby union flankers
Rugby union players from Brisbane